Carvill Hall, also known as Carvill's Prevention, Salter's Load. or Packerton, is a historic home located at Chestertown, Kent County, Maryland. It is a -story Flemish bond brick house, with exterior corbeled brick chimneys at each gable end. The main block was built between 1694 and 1709. Additions to the main block date to the 19th century.

It was listed on the National Register of Historic Places in 1973.

References

External links
, including photo from 1975, at Maryland Historical Trust

Houses on the National Register of Historic Places in Maryland
Houses in Kent County, Maryland
Historic American Buildings Survey in Maryland
National Register of Historic Places in Kent County, Maryland